Devil's Cave may refer to:

Geography
Caverna da Tapagem, Jacupiranga State Park near São Paulo, Brazil
 Devil's Cave, North Aurora, Illinois, United States
Devil's Cave (near Pottenstein), Pottenstein, Bavaria, Germany
Devil's Den (cave), Williston, Florida, United States
Devil's Kitchen (cave), Mackinac Island, Michigan, United States
Devil's Lair, Western Australia
Devil's Throat Cave, Bulgaria

Other
Spice and the Devil's Cave, a book by Agnes Hewes

See also
Devils Hole (disambiguation)